Hustlers HC was an Asian hip hop group based in West London, England. The group formed in 1991, and consisted of three members: two rappers, The Hustler MC (Paul Arora) and Ski-Man (Mandeep Walia), and DJ Mitts.
Hustlers HC were the first Sikh rap crew to come out of the United Kingdom with a strong socio-political message. They did much to bridge religious divides in the Asian community as well as creating much respect for Sikhs in the Rap fraternity. Hustlers HC were also responsible, along with DJ Ritu, for organising and maintaining one of the first and most respected Asian club nights in London, Bombay Jungle at the Wag Club. The trio made their first television appearance on the series Rhythm & Raag in 1992.

Music 
Along with Fun-Da-Mental and ADF, Hustlers HC is a band who promotes the disruption of racial and ethnic conception of 'blackness' and 'Asianness.' Through their combination of Asian instrumentation and lyrics with “black” genre of Rap, they explain why Asians are into rap instead of supporting that Rap is a black entity. This makes a huge difference in that they “signify a potentiality in the disruption of essentialising racial/ethnic boundary formation and identification, and mark the possibility of a transcendence in the normative representations of both ‘blackness’ and ‘Asianness.’ (Sharma 43)

The group has released two singles through Nation Records: "Big Trouble in Little Asia" / "Let the Hustlers Play" in 1993 and "On a Ride" / "Vigilante" 1994. They are credited with being one of the first Asian hip hop groups. Their music mixes gangsta rap lyrics and stylistics with jazz like beats, which combines to form a unique hip hop sound. The group uses their lyrics to discuss political and social issues pertinent to the Asian community.

In the song "Big Trouble in Little Asia", Hustlers HC intelligently discusses the issues of post-colonial India, racism in Britain, and the richness of Asian culture. The blend of hip-hop and Gangsta-rap narrativity as articulated in "Big Trouble in Little Asia" was one of the first to directly address important elements about the relationship between Asian culture and political life in Britain. In common with many rappers, Hustlers HC narrates in this song about the struggle and defence of Asian culture in the face of racist, oppressive forces, both in the homeland and in Britain.  "Big Trouble in Little Asia" is one of their tracks to first articulate directly some significant dimensions of Asian cultural and political life in Britain. This piece featured a haunting melodic guitar line with a jazzy Hip-hop beat. The message is intensified by syncopated Reggae beats, and a rising tempo. However, there is no innocent celebration of an Asian cultural identity in this song, but rather it explores the internal opposition of an Asian cultural formation existing within a hostile and racially violent Britain. This track is significant in that it parallels the consciousness rappers in other regions of the world. They parallel it because they rap about the historical problems in the "homeland" but also rap about the current issues in Britain. What makes Hustlers HC unique is also the fact that they were "the first Sikh rap crew to come out of the UK with a strong socio-political message." Hustlers HC was influential because they opened doors for whole groups of people in their respective countries.   In this track, Hustlers HC are concerned with the divisions caused by certain religious and ethnic affiliations, and advocate for political unity in fighting racial oppression.  They criticise the increased gang culture and the violence across ethno-religious groups within the Asian community. The end of the 'Big Trouble in Little Asia' not only shares the theme of "ghetto tales" of gangsta rap, but also suggests that although the narrative may not directly apply to the listener, its lyrics tell a story of social significance and deserves reflection.  Not only does the song tell the value of a past cultural identity, "my culture is all I have," but also motivates for an identity to be recreated and transformed in the present as "my culture I will find." In the Hustler HC brief published by Nation Records, the song is characterised as a "call to all Hindu, Muslim, and Sikh youth to unify against [the previously mentioned] problems.  This call for unity lies at the core of Hustlers HC philosophy." It is said that "Big Trouble in Little Asia" increasingly intensifies its message with the combination of "a haunting melodic guitar riff and jazzy hip-hop beat that carry the listener, and the rising tempo- syncopated by Reggae beats." Bhangra music movement in general encouraged Asians in England to appreciate their heritage and not be ashamed, despite the rampant bigotry of the period.  The group is known for passing judgment on completely assimilated Asians, a group they view as sell-outs who have abandoned their culture.  In the "Big Trouble in Little Asia", the group raps, "Weakened the most by the coconut", referring to individuals who are "brown on the outside but white on the inside".  To this end, Hustlers HC advocate for political unity as well as the preservation of the Asian identity.  They are criticising Asians who have assimilated into British culture and become cultural sell-outs.

Hustlers HC often blends hip-hop and gangster rap lyrically while allowing the beat to be influenced by a more relaxed and smooth jazz-influenced sound.  'Big Trouble in Little Asia' became one of the first tracks to bring Asian politics and culture to the ears of Britain.  "A haunted melodic guitar riff and jazzy Hip-Hop beat carry the listener, and the rising tempo—syncopated by Reggae breaks—increasingly intensifies the message."

“Their track 'Big Trouble in Little Asia' is one of the first to articulate directly some significant dimensions of Asian cultural and political like in Britain. A haunting melodic guitar riff and jazzy Hip-Hop beat carry the listener, and the rising tempo—syncopated by Reggae breaks—increasingly intensifies the message." One of their popular song lyrics reads, " Your corrupt culture makes my rich culture look poor, I'm trying to learn more about my past, I'm fighting to make my culture last…" The Hustlers HC is trying to make a change where they are in the world any way they can. They need to use their language in forms of rap music to get their message out and for others to hear the hardships they are presented with day-to-day.

On the flip side of 'Big Trouble...' was "Let the Hustlers Play" which literally is a more playful "up-front funky hip hop tune with unmistakable Asian flavour combining dope beats with boasting toasting lyrical skills..."

In the 1994 release "On a Ride" / "Vigilante", produced and co-written by Simon Underwood, Hustlers HC follows a similar pattern to their first single with a relaxed funky track and an angry political track.  "On a Ride" has a fun relaxed beat and is based around a break from the 70's British funk band Hi-Tension.  The B-Side, "Vigilante – mind of the confused and angry" "takes on various view points expressed by young Asians as to how to tackle the increasing number of racially motivated attacks vented against their communities."

The music of Hustlers HC contributed to lessening the religious gap in Asian society in addition to giving Sikhs a new-found respect within the rap community.  They also assisted the creation of "one of the first and most respected Asian night clubs in London, Bombay Jungle at the Wag Club". In both of their records, Hustlers HC has managed to bridge the gap of the conscious and the playful.

Discography
"On a Ride" / "Vigilante" (single) – 1994
"Big Trouble in Little Asia" / "Let the Hustlers Play" (single) – 1993

References

External links
britishhiphop.co.uk – The original UK Hip Hop History

English hip hop groups
Musical groups from London
Musical groups established in 1991
1991 establishments in England
Nation Records artists